NGC 759 is an elliptical galaxy located 230 million light-years away in the constellation Andromeda. NGC 759 was discovered by astronomer by Heinrich d'Arrest on September 17, 1865. It is a member of Abell 262.

Despite being classified as a radio galaxy, the radio emission in NGC 759 could be due to star formation rather than an active galactic nucleus.

Dust disk
The central region of NGC 759 harbors a face-on dust disk with tightly wound spiral structure. The dust disk also contains a smaller circumnuclear molecular gas ring that has star formation in H II regions. These features may be the result of a merger of gas-rich disk galaxies or by the accretion of gas-rich material. In either scenario, the gas would have lost momentum and fallen to the center of the galaxy to produce the disk and current star formation. However, Vlasyuk et al. suggests that the disk and the smaller circumnuclear molecular gas ring with star formation inside the main disk formed from a tidal encounter between NGC 759 and a large spiral galaxy which was accompanied by a substantial gas accretion.

Molecular gas
NGC 759 contains 2.4 × 109 M☉ of molecular gas. The gas may be the result of the same merger event that produced the circumnuclear molecular gas ring and the main disk.

SN 2002fb
NGC 759 has had one supernova, SN 2002fb which was discovered on September 6, 2002. It was classified as a type Ia supernova.

See also
 List of NGC objects (1–1000)

References

External links

759
7397
Andromeda (constellation)
Astronomical objects discovered in 1865
Elliptical galaxies
Radio galaxies
Abell 262
1440